Captain William Bolton (died 1817) was a captain in the Royal Navy who served during the French Revolutionary Wars.

His first known service was when he passed the Lieutenant's exam in 1789, becoming a Lieutenant in October of the following year. He took command of Aimable in September 1803, and Fisgard from August 1805 to mid-1809, serving in Jamaica and the North Sea and taking part in the Walcheren Campaign in 1809.

He was appointed a Companion of the Order of the Bath on 16 September 1815.

Notes

References

Royal Navy personnel of the French Revolutionary Wars
Royal Navy personnel of the Napoleonic Wars
Companions of the Order of the Bath
Year of birth missing
1817 deaths
Royal Navy officers